HMS Prince of Wales was a King George V-class battleship of the Royal Navy that was built at the Cammell Laird shipyard in Birkenhead, England. She had an extensive battle history, first seeing action in August 1940 while still being outfitted in her drydock when she was attacked and damaged by German aircraft. In her brief career, she was involved in several key actions of the Second World War, including the May 1941 Battle of the Denmark Strait where she scored three hits on the German battleship Bismarck, forcing Bismarck to abandon her raiding mission and head to port for repairs. Prince of Wales later escorted one of the Malta convoys in the Mediterranean, during which she was attacked by Italian aircraft. In her final action, she attempted to intercept Japanese troop convoys off the coast of Malaya as part of Force Z when she was sunk by Japanese aircraft on 10 December 1941, two days after the attack on Pearl Harbor.

She was sunk alongside her consort, the battlecruiser HMS Repulse, in an attack by 85 Mitsubishi G3M and G4M bombers of the Japanese navy air service. HMS Prince of Wales and Repulse became the first capital ships to be sunk solely by air power on the open sea, a harbinger of the diminishing role this class of ships was subsequently to play in naval warfare.

Construction 
In the aftermath of the First World War, the Washington Naval Treaty was drawn up in 1922 in an effort to stop an arms race developing between Britain, Japan, France, Italy and the United States. This treaty limited the number of ships each nation was allowed to build and capped the tonnage of all capital ships at 35,000 tons. These restrictions were extended in 1930 through the Treaty of London, however, by the mid-1930s Japan and Italy had withdrawn from both of these treaties, and the British became concerned about a lack of modern battleships within their navy. As a result, the Admiralty ordered the construction of a new battleship class: the King George V class. Due to the provisions of both the Washington Naval Treaty and the Treaty of London, both of which were still in effect when the King George Vs were being designed, the main armament of the class was limited to the  guns prescribed under these instruments. They were the only battleships built at that time to adhere to the treaty, and even though it soon became apparent to the British that the other signatories to the treaty were ignoring its requirements, it was too late to change the design of the class before they were laid down in 1937.

Prince of Wales was originally to be named King Edward VIII but upon the abdication of Edward VIII the ship was renamed even before she had been laid down. This occurred at Cammell Laird's shipyard in Birkenhead on 1 January 1937, although it was not until 3 May 1939 that she was launched. She was still fitting out when war was declared in September, causing her construction schedule, and that of her sister, to be accelerated. Nevertheless, the late delivery of gun mountings caused delays in her outfitting.

In early August 1940, while she was still being outfitted and was in a semi-complete state, Prince of Wales was attacked by German aircraft. One bomb fell between the ship and a wet basin wall, narrowly missing a 100-ton dockside crane, and exploded underwater below the bilge keel. The explosion took place about six feet from the ship's port side in the vicinity of the aft group of 5.25-inch guns. The flooding was severe, because final compartment air tests had not yet been made and the ship did not have her pumping system in operation.

The water was pumped out through the joint efforts of a local fire company and the shipyard, and Prince of Wales was later dry-docked for permanent repairs. This damage and the problem with the delivery of her main guns and turrets delayed her completion. As the war progressed there was an urgent need for capital ships, and so her completion was advanced by postponing compartment air tests, ventilation tests and thorough testing of her bilge, ballast and fuel-oil systems.

Description 

Prince of Wales displaced  as built and  fully loaded.

She was powered by Parsons geared steam turbines, driving four propeller shafts. Steam was provided by eight Admiralty boilers which normally delivered , but could deliver  with forced draft.
The ship carried  of fuel oil. During full-power trials on 31 March 1941, Prince of Wales at 42,100 tons displacement achieved 28 knots with 111,600 shp at 228 rpm and a specific fuel consumption of 0.73 lb per shp.

Armament 
Prince of Wales mounted 10 BL 14-inch (356 mm) Mk VII guns. The 14-inch guns were mounted in one Mark II twin turret forward and two Mark III quadruple turrets, one forward and one aft. The guns could be elevated 40 degrees and depressed 3 degrees. Training arcs were: turret "A", 286 degrees; turret "B", 270 degrees; turret "Y", 270 degrees. Training and elevating was done by hydraulic drives, with rates of two and eight degrees per second, respectively. The secondary armament consisted of 16 QF 5.25-inch (133 mm) Mk I guns which were mounted in eight twin mounts, weighing 81 tons each. The guns could be elevated to 70 degrees and depressed to 5 degrees. The normal rate of fire was ten to twelve rounds per minute, but in practice, the guns could only fire seven to eight rounds per minute. Along with her main and secondary batteries, Prince of Wales carried 32 QF 2 pdr (1.575-inch, 40.0 mm) Mk.VIII "pom-pom" anti-aircraft guns. She also carried 80 UP projectors, short-range rocket-firing anti-aircraft weapons used in the early days of the Second World War by the Royal Navy.

Operational service

Action with Bismarck 

On 22 May 1941, Prince of Wales, the battlecruiser  and six destroyers were ordered to take station south of Iceland and intercept the  if she attempted to break out into the Atlantic. Captain John Leach knew that main-battery breakdowns were likely to occur, since Vickers-Armstrongs technicians had already corrected some that took place during training exercises in Scapa Flow. These technicians were personally requested by the captain to remain aboard. They did so and played an important role in the resulting action.

The next day Bismarck, in company with the heavy cruiser , was reported heading south-westward in the Denmark Strait. His battle plan called for Prince of Wales and Hood to concentrate on Bismarck, while the cruisers  and  would handle Prinz Eugen. However the two cruisers were not informed of this plan because of strict radio silence. The weather improved, with  visibility, and crews were at action stations by 05:10.

At 05:37 an enemy contact report was made, and course was changed to starboard to close range. Neither ship was in good fighting trim. Hood, designed twenty-five years earlier, lacked adequate decking armour and would have to close the range quickly, as she would become progressively less vulnerable to plunging shellfire at shorter ranges. She had completed an overhaul in March and her crew had not been adequately retrained. The British ships made their last course change at 05:49, but they had made their approach too fine (the German ships were only 30 degrees on the starboard bow) and their aft turrets could not fire. Prinz Eugen, with Bismarck astern, had Prince of Wales and Hood slightly forward of the beam, and both ships could deliver full broadsides.

There was some confusion among the British as to which ship was Bismarck and thirty seconds earlier Hood had mistakenly opened fire on Prinz Eugen as the German ships had similar profiles. Hoods first salvo straddled the enemy ship, but Prinz Eugen, in less than three minutes, scored 8-inch-shell hits on Hood. The first shots by Prince of Wales – two three-gun salvoes at ten-second intervals – were 1,000 yards over. The turret rangefinders on Prince of Wales could not be used because of spray over the bow and fire was instead directed from the  rangefinders in the control tower.

The sixth, ninth and thirteenth salvos were straddles and two hits were made on Bismarck. One shell holed her bow and caused Bismarck to lose 1,000 tons of fuel oil, mostly to salt-water contamination. The other fell short, and entered Bismarck below her side armour belt, the shell exploded and flooded the auxiliary boiler machinery room and forced the shutdown of two boilers due to a slow leak in the boiler room immediately aft. The loss of fuel and boiler power were decisive factors in the Bismarcks decision to return to port. In Prince of Wales, "A1" gun ceased fire after the first salvo due to a defect. Sporadic breakdowns occurred until the decision to turn away was made, and during the turn "Y" turret jammed.

Both German ships initially concentrated their fire on Hood and destroyed her with salvoes of 8- and 15-inch shells. An 8-inch shell hit the boat deck and struck a ready service locker for ammunition, and a fire blazed high above the first superstructure deck. As the turn began, Bismarck straddled Hood with her third and fourth four-gun salvoes and at 06:01 the fifth salvo hit her, causing a large explosion. Flames shot up near Hoods masts, then an orange-coloured fireball and an enormous smoke cloud obliterated the ship. On Prince of Wales, it seemed that Hood collapsed amidships, and the bow and stern could be seen rising as she rapidly settled. Prince of Wales made a sharp starboard turn to avoid hitting the debris and in doing so further closed the range between her and the German ships. In the four-minute action, Hood, the largest battlecruiser in the world, had been sunk. 1,419 officers and men were killed. Only three men survived.

Prince of Wales fired unopposed until she began a port turn at 05:57, when Prinz Eugen took her under fire. After Hood exploded at 06:01, the Germans opened intense and accurate fire on Prince of Wales, with 15-inch, 8-inch and 5.9-inch guns. A heavy hit was sustained below the waterline as Prince of Wales manoeuvred through the wreckage of Hood. At 06:02, a 15-inch shell struck the starboard side of the compass platform and killed the majority of the personnel there. The navigating officer was wounded, but Captain Leach was unhurt. Casualties were caused by the fragments from the shell's ballistic cap and the material it dislodged in its diagonal path through the compass platform. A 15-inch diving shell penetrated the ship's side below the armour belt amidships, failed to explode and came to rest in the wing compartments on the starboard side of the after boiler rooms. The shell was discovered and defused when the ship was docked at Rosyth.

At 06:05 Captain Leach decided to disengage and laid down a heavy smokescreen to cover Prince of Waless escape. Leach then radioed Norfolk that Hood had been sunk and went to join Suffolk  astern of Bismarck. All 12 salvos missed. After losing Bismarck owing to poor visibility, and after searching for 12 hours, Prince of Wales headed for Iceland. Thirteen of her crew had been killed, and nine wounded.

On Friday 6 June, while in dry dock, a hole was found just above the starboard bilge keel. After the inner space had been pumped out, an unexploded shell from Bismarck was found nose forward, with its fuse, but without a ballistic cap.  The shell was removed by the Bomb Disposal Officer from HMS Cochrane

Atlantic Charter meeting 

After repairs at Rosyth, Prince of Wales took Prime Minister Winston Churchill across the Atlantic for a secret conference with US President Franklin D. Roosevelt. On 5 August Roosevelt boarded the cruiser  from the presidential yacht . Augusta proceeded from Massachusetts to Placentia Bay and Argentia in Newfoundland with the cruiser  and five destroyers, arriving on 7 August while the presidential yacht played a decoy role by continuing to cruise New England waters as if the president were still on board. At Placentia Bay, Newfoundland, Roosevelt transferred to the destroyer  to meet Churchill on board Prince of Wales. The conference continued from 10 to 12 August aboard Augusta and, at the end of the conference, the Atlantic Charter was proclaimed. Prince of Wales arrived back at Scapa Flow on 18 August.

Mediterranean duty 
In September 1941, Prince of Wales was assigned to Force H, in the Mediterranean. The force provided an escort for Operation Halberd, a supply convoy from Gibraltar to Malta. On 27 September the convoy was attacked by Italian aircraft, with Prince of Wales shooting down several with her  guns. Later that day there were reports that units of the Italian Fleet were approaching. Prince of Wales, the battleship Rodney and the aircraft carrier  were despatched to intercept, but the search proved fruitless. The convoy arrived in Malta without further incident, and Prince of Wales returned to Gibraltar, before sailing on to Scapa Flow, arriving there on 6 October.

Far East 

On 25 October Prince of Wales and a destroyer escort left home waters bound for Singapore, there to rendezvous with the battlecruiser  and the aircraft carrier . Indomitable however ran aground off Jamaica a few days later and was unable to proceed. Calling at Freetown and Cape Town South Africa to refuel and generate publicity, Prince of Wales also stopped in Mauritius and the Maldive Islands. Prince of Wales reached Colombo, Ceylon, on 28 November, joining Repulse the next day. On 2 December the fleet docked in Singapore. Prince of Wales then became the flagship of Force Z, under the command of Admiral Sir Tom Phillips. Admiral of the Home Fleet Sir John Tovey was opposed to sending any of the new King George V battleships as he believed that they were not suited to operating in tropical climates.

Japanese troop-convoys were first sighted on 6 December. Two days later, Japanese aircraft raided Singapore; although the Prince of Waless anti-aircraft batteries opened fire, they scored no hits and had no effect on the Japanese aircraft. A signal was received from the Admiralty in London ordering the British squadron to commence hostilities, and that evening, confident that a protective air umbrella would be provided by the RAF presence in the region, Admiral Phillips set sail.

The object of the sortie was to attack Japanese transports at Kota Bharu, but in the afternoon of 9 December the Japanese submarine I-65 spotted the British ships, and in the evening they were detected by Japanese aerial reconnaissance. By this time it had been made clear that no RAF fighter support would be forthcoming. At midnight a signal was received that Japanese forces were landing at Kuantan in Malaya. Force Z was diverted to investigate. At 02:11 on 10 December the force was again sighted by a Japanese submarine and at 08:00 arrived off Kuantan, only to discover that the reported landings were a diversion.

At 11:00 that morning the first Japanese air attack began. Eight Type 96 "Nell" bombers dropped their bombs close to Repulse, one passing through the hangar roof and exploding on the 1-inch plating of the main deck below. The second attack force, comprising seventeen "Nells" armed with torpedoes, arrived at 11:30, divided into two attack formations. Despite reports to the contrary, Prince of Wales was struck by only one torpedo. Meanwhile, Repulse avoided the seven torpedoes aimed at her, as well as bombs dropped by six other "Nells" a few minutes later.

The torpedo struck Prince of Wales on the port side aft, abaft "Y" Turret, wrecking the outer propeller shaft on that side and destroying bulkheads to one degree or another along the shaft all the way to B Engine Room. This caused rapid uncontrollable flooding and put the entire electrical system in the after part of the ship out of action. Lacking effective damage control, she soon took on a heavy list.

A third torpedo attack developed against Repulse and once again she avoided taking any hits.

A fourth attack, conducted by torpedo-carrying Type 1 "Bettys", developed. This one scored hits on Repulse and she sank at 12:33. Six aircraft from this wave also attacked Prince of Wales, hitting her with three torpedoes, causing further damage and flooding. Finally, a  bomb hit Prince of Wales'''s catapult deck, penetrated to the main deck, where it exploded, causing many casualties in the makeshift aid centre in the Cinema Flat. Several other bombs from this attack scored very near misses, indenting the hull, popping rivets and causing hull plates to split along the seams and intensifying the flooding. At 13:15 the order to abandon ship was given, and at 13:20 Prince of Wales capsized to port, floated for a few brief moments upside down, and sank stern first; Admiral Phillips and Captain Leach were among the 327 fatalities.

 Aftermath Prince of Wales and Repulse were the first capital ships to be sunk solely by naval air power on the open sea (albeit by land-based rather than carrier-based aircraft), a harbinger of the diminishing role this class of ships was to play in naval warfare thereafter. It is often pointed out, however, that contributing factors to the sinking of Prince of Wales were her surface-scanning radars being inoperable in the humid tropic climate, depriving Force Z of one of its most potent early-warning devices, and the critical early damage she sustained from the first torpedo. Another factor which led to Prince of Waless demise was the loss of her dynamos, depriving Prince of Wales of many of her electric pumps. Further electrical failures left parts of the ship in total darkness, and added to the difficulties of her damage repair parties as they attempted to counter the flooding.
The sinking was the subject of an inquiry chaired by Mr. Justice Bucknill, but the true causes of the ship's loss were only established when divers examined the wreck after the war.  The Director of Naval Construction's report on the sinking claimed that the ship's anti-aircraft guns could have inflicted heavy casualties before torpedoes were dropped, if not preventing the successful conclusion of attack had crews been more adequately trained in their operation.<ref>{{cite web|url=http://www.nationalarchives.gov.uk/catalogue/displaycataloguedetails.asp?CATID=4547444&CATLN=6&accessmethod=5|title=Loss of HMS Prince of Wales: reports of 2nd Bucknill Committee, etc|publisher=The Admiralty|access-date=6 June 2009}}</ref>

The wreck 

A Royal Navy White Ensign attached to a line on a buoy tied to a propeller shaft is periodically renewed. The wreck site was designated a 'Protected Place' in 2001 under the Protection of Military Remains Act 1986, just prior to the 60th anniversary of her sinking. The ship's bell was manually raised in 2002 by British technical divers with the permission of the Ministry of Defence and blessing of the Force Z Survivors Association. It was restored, then presented for display by First Sea Lord and Chief of Naval Staff, Admiral Sir Alan West, to the Merseyside Maritime Museum in Liverpool. The bell has been since moved to the National Museum of the Royal Navy at the Portsmouth Historic Dockyard for display in the Hear My Story Galleries.

In May 2007, Expedition 'Job 74', a dedicated survey of the exterior hull of both Prince of Wales and Repulse, was conducted. The expedition's findings sparked considerable interest among naval architects and marine engineers around the world; as they detailed the nature of the damage to Prince of Wales and the exact location and number of torpedo hits. Consequently, the findings contained in the initial expedition report and later supplementary reports were analysed by the SNAME (Society of Naval Architects and Marine Engineers) Marine Forensics Committee and a resultant paper was drawn up entitled Death of a Battleship: A Re-analysis of the Tragic Loss of HMS Prince of Wales, and was subsequently presented at a meeting of RINA (Royal Institution of Naval Architects) and IMarEST (Institute of Marine Engineering, Science & Technology) members in London in 2009 by Mr William Garzke. This report was also presented to the IMarEST, this time in New York, in 2011. However, in 2012 the original paper was updated and expanded (and renamed Death of a Battleship: The Loss of HMS Prince of Wales. A Marine Forensics Analysis of the Sinking) in light of a subsequent diver being able to penetrate deep into the port outer propeller shaft tunnel with a high definition camera, taking photos along the entire length of the propeller shaft all the way to the aft bulkhead of 'B' Engine Room.

In October 2014, the Daily Telegraph reported that both Prince of Wales and Repulse were being "extensively damaged" with explosives by scrap metal dealers.

It is currently traditional for every passing Royal Navy ship to perform a remembrance service over the site of the wrecks.

Replica bell for successor

In spring 2019, Cammell Laird was commissioned to make a replica of the ship's bell for the ship's successor, the second . The original at the National Museum of the Royal Navy's Portsmouth Historic Dockyard location was surveyed as part of the process.

Cammell Laird were able to contact Utley Offshore in St Helens, the foundry that made both the original bell and 's bell, who still had the original pattern based on the 1908 Admiralty design. Compared to the bronze or bell metal that is used in most modern ship bells, specially sourced nickel silver was used for authenticity. The engraving was done by Shawcross in Birkenhead, while Cammell Laird shipwrights constructed the hardwood base. Cammell Laird COO Tony Graham presented the finished replica to commanding officer Captain Darren Houston during the ship's week-long visit to Liverpool in March 2020.

Refits 
During her career, Prince of Wales was refitted on several occasions, to bring her equipment up to date. The following are the dates and details of the refits undertaken.

References

Notes

Citations

Bibliography
 
 
 
 

 
 
 
 
 Hein, David. "Vulnerable: HMS Prince of Wales in 1941". Journal of Military History 77, no. 3 (July 2013): 955–989. Abstract online: http://www.smh-hq.org/jmh/jmhvols/773.html
 Horodyski, Joseph M. Military Heritage 3, no. 3 (December 2001): 69–77.

Web
 Link to a wreck survey report compiled after Expedition 'Job 74', May 2007 
 2012 update analysis of the loss of Prince of Wales, by Garzke, Dulin and Denlay
 Description of lower hull indentation damage on wreck of HMS Prince of Wales
 SI 2008/0950 Current designation under Protection of Military Remains Act 1986
 Navy News 2001 Announcement of designation under the Protection of Military Remains Act 1986
 Link to a 2008 survey report, specifically regarding the stern torpedo damage to PoW.
 
 
 Naval Staff History Second World War Battle Summary No. 14 (revised) Loss of H. M. Ships Prince of Wales and Repulse 10 December 1941.

External links 

 List of Crew 
 Newsreel footage of Operation Halberd, as filmed from Prince of Wales
 Photos of Prince of Wales at MaritimeQuest

1939 ships
Battleships sunk by aircraft
King George V-class battleships (1939)
Maritime incidents in December 1941
Ships built on the River Mersey
Military of Singapore under British rule
Protected Wrecks of the United Kingdom
World War II battleships of the United Kingdom
World War II shipwrecks in the South China Sea
Ships sunk by Japanese aircraft
Wreck diving sites
Underwater diving sites in Malaysia